USS L-5 (SS-44) was an L-class submarine built for the United States Navy during the 1910s.

Description
The L-class boats designed by Lake Torpedo Boat (L-5 through L-8) were built to slightly different specifications from the other L boats, which were designed by Electric Boat, and are sometimes considered a separate L-5 class. They displaced  on the surface and  submerged. The L-class submarines had a crew of 28 officers and enlisted men.

For surface running, the boats were powered by two  diesel engines, each driving one propeller shaft. When submerged each propeller was driven by a  electric motor. They could reach  on the surface and  underwater.

The boats were armed with four 18-inch (450 mm)  torpedo tubes in the bow. They carried four reloads, for a total of eight torpedoes. The L-class submarines were also armed with a single 3"/50 caliber deck gun.

Construction and career
L-5s keel was laid down on 14 May 1914 by Lake Torpedo Boat Company in Bridgeport, Connecticut, launched on 1 May 1916, sponsored by Mrs. Rosalind Robinson, and commissioned on 17 February 1918. After exercises along the Atlantic coast, L-5 departed Charleston, South Carolina, on 15 October 1918 with Submarine Division 6 and reached the Azores on 7 November. Following the Armistice with Germany on 11 November, L-5 headed west, arriving Bermuda on 1 December.  She participated in exercises in the Caribbean Sea before steaming on to San Pedro, California, where she arrived 13 February 1919.

From 1919 to 1922, she remained on the West Coast experimenting with new torpedoes and underseas detection equipment. L-5 departed San Pedro on 25 July 1922, and, after visits in Mexico, Nicaragua, and the Panama Canal Zone, she arrived Hampton Roads, Virginia, on 28 September. The submarine remained there until she decommissioned on 5 December 1922. She was sold on 21 December 1925 to Passaic Salvage and Reclamation Company in Newark, New Jersey, and scrapped.

Notes

References

External links
 

United States L-class submarines
World War I submarines of the United States
Ships built in Groton, Connecticut
1916 ships